Abisara chelina is a butterfly in the family Riodinidae. It is found in southern Burma, Thailand, Peninsular Malaysia, Indo China and southern China.

Subspecies
Abisara chelina chelina (Yunnan)
Abisara chelina duanhuii Huang, 2001 (south-eastern Tibet)

References

Butterflies described in 1904
Abisara
Insects of Myanmar
Insects of Thailand
Insects of China
Butterflies of Asia